The 2006 Saskatchewan Scott Tournament of Hearts women's provincial curling championship, was held February 1–5 at the Gallagher Centre in Yorkton, Saskatchewan. The winning team of Tracey Streifel, represented Saskatchewan at the 2006 Scott Tournament of Hearts in London, Ontario, where the team finished round robin with a 2–9 record.

Teams

Standings

Results

Draw 1
February 1, 7:00 PM CT

Draw 2
February 2, 9:30 AM CT

Draw 3
February 2, 2:00 PM CT

Draw 4
February 3, 9:30 AM CT

Draw 5
February 3, 2:00 PM CT

Draw 6
February 3, 7:00 PM CT

Draw 7
February 4, 9:30 AM CT

TieBreaker
February 4, 7:00 PM CT

Playoffs

Semifinal
February 5, 9:30 AM CT

Final
February 5, 2:00 PM CT

References

Saskatchewan Scott Tournament Of Hearts, 2006
2006 in Saskatchewan
Curling in Saskatchewan